The 2013 FIFA U-20 World Cup was the nineteenth edition of the FIFA U-20 World Cup, since its inception in 1977 as the FIFA World Youth Championship. It ran from 21 June to 13 July 2013. At the FIFA Executive Meeting in Zürich on 3 March 2011, Turkey beat other bids to host the series games, from host competition by the United Arab Emirates and Uzbekistan. In its bid, Turkey suggested the use of thirteen stadiums in ten of its cities, before deciding in February 2012, that seven cities would play host to games.

This tournament marked the first time in its history that neither Argentina nor Brazil (the most successful teams in the competition) qualified. It was also only the second time that Brazil had not taken part (the first time was the 1979 edition).

France won the tournament and their first U-20 World Cup, and thus became the first nation to win all five FIFA 11-a-side men's titles (FIFA World Cup, FIFA Confederations Cup, FIFA U-20 World Cup, FIFA U-17 World Cup, and the Olympic football tournament).

Bids
At the deadline date of 17 January 2011, three member associations confirmed they would be bidding for the event. Neither Turkey nor Uzbekistan had ever been hosts to a FIFA competition, while the United Arab Emirates were hosts of the U-20s in 2003.

  Turkey
  United Arab Emirates
  Uzbekistan
  Zimbabwe (withdrew bid)

Venues

Qualification
In addition to host nation Turkey, 23 nations qualified from six separate continental competitions.

 1.  Teams that made their debut.

Organization and emblem
To mark the one year countdown date to the competition, FIFA, as well as members of the Turkish FA, announced that the emblem would be presented to the media on 25 June 2012 at Ciragan Palace Mabeyn Hall in Istanbul. Details of the ticketing access were made publicly available on 30 November 2012.

Host city logos for each participating stadium were shown to the general public on 20 March 2013, with each taking inspiration from their surroundings. The official logo included an Evil Eye protector, worn or hung inside Turkish homes to bring luck.

Mascot
The mascot for the tournament was called Kanki, a blue-eyed Kangal puppy.

Theme song
The official theme song for the tournament was Yıldızlar Buradan Yükseliyor, which is translated as Building Bridges for Rising Stars, performed by Turkish rock band Gece.

Draw
The final draw was held at the Grand Tarabya Hotel in Istanbul on 25 March 2013, at 19:00 local time.

On 12 February 2013, FIFA announced the procedure of the draw. The 24 teams were divided into four differing pots:
Pot 1: The continental champions of six confederations
Pot 2: Remaining teams from AFC and CAF
Pot 3: Remaining teams from CONCACAF and CONMEBOL
Pot 4: Host and remaining teams from UEFA
Turkey was assigned to position C1, and Spain was assigned to Group A. As a basic principle, teams from the same confederation could not be drawn against each other at the group stage, except in Group A where there were two teams from UEFA.

As the CAF U-20 Championship was not completed at the time of the draw, a separate draw took place at the tournament's conclusion on 30 March in Oran, Algeria to determine the groups where the second, third and fourth-placed CAF teams would play in. As the OFC U-20 Championship was realize after at time of the draw, New Zealand appared in Pot 1 as OFC Champion.

Match officials
The 23 referee trios were announced by FIFA on 13 May 2013.

Squads

Teams had to name a 21-man squad (three of whom had to be goalkeepers) by the FIFA deadline. The squads were announced by FIFA on 14 June 2013.

Group stage
The winners and runners-up from each group, as well as the best four third-placed teams, qualified for the first round of the knockout stage (round of 16).

The ranking of each team in each group was determined as follows:
 points obtained in all group matches;
 goal difference in all group matches;
 number of goals scored in all group matches;
If two or more teams were equal on the basis of the above three criteria, their rankings were determined as follows:
 points obtained in the group matches between the teams concerned;
 goal difference in the group matches between the teams concerned;
 number of goals scored in the group matches between the teams concerned;
 drawing of lots by the FIFA Organising Committee.

All times are local, UTC+03:00.

Group A

Group B

Group C

Group D

Group E

Group F

Ranking of third-placed teams
The four best teams among those ranked third were determined as follows:
 points obtained in all group matches;
 goal difference in all group matches;
 number of goals scored in all group matches;
 drawing of lots by the FIFA Organising Committee.

Knockout stage
In the knockout stages, if a match was level at the end of normal playing time, extra time was played (two periods of fifteen minutes each) and followed, if necessary, by a penalty shoot-out to determine the winner, except for the play-off for third place, where no extra time would be played as the match was played directly before the final.

Round of 16

Quarter-finals

Semi-finals

Third place match

Final

Awards
The following awards were given out after the conclusion of the tournament:

Goalscorers
With six goals, Ebenezer Assifuah is the top scorers in the tournament. In total, 152 goals were scored by 99 different players, with one of them credited as own goals.

6 goals
 Ebenezer Assifuah

5 goals
 Bruma
 Jesé

4 goals

 Nicolás Castillo
 Yaya Sanogo
 Nicolás López

3 goals

 Juan Quintero
 Florian Thauvin
 Farhan Shakor
 Abdul Jeleel Ajagun
 Aladje

2 goals

 Ángelo Henríquez
 Jhon Córdoba
 Ante Rebić
 Ahmed Hassan Koka
 Jean-Christophe Bahebeck
 Geoffrey Kondogbia
 Kennedy Ashia
 Frank Acheampong
 Richmond Boakye
 Ali Faez
 Ali Adnan
 Kwon Chang-hoon
 Ryu Seung-woo
 Olarenwaju Kayode
 Aminu Umar
 Gerard Deulofeu
 Cenk Şahin
 Giorgian De Arrascaeta
 Abbosbek Makhstaliev
 Sardor Rakhmonov
 Igor Sergeev

1 goal

 Joshua Brillante
 Daniel De Silva
 Jamie Maclaren
 Christian Bravo
 Felipe Mora
 Andrés Rentería
 Marko Livaja
 Stipe Perica
 Maykel Reyes
 Kahraba
 Trezeguet
 Diego Coca
 José Peña
 Conor Coady
 Harry Kane
 Luke Williams
 Paul Pogba
 Jordan Veretout
 Thibaut Vion
 Kurt Zouma
 Michael Anaba
 Joseph Attamah
 Moses Odjer
 Seidu Salifu
 Andreas Bouchalakis
 Dimitris Diamantakos
 Dimitris Kolovos
 Kostas Stafylidis
 Mohannad Abdul-Raheem
 Ammar Abdul-Hussein
 Mahdi Kamil
 Saif Salman
 Jung Hyun-cheol
 Kim Hyun
 Lee Gwang-hoon
 Song Joo-hoon
 Samba Diallo
 Adama Niane
 Marco Bueno
 Jesús Corona
 Jesús Escoboza
 Jonathan Espericueta
 Arturo González
 Uvaldo Luna
 Louis Fenton
 Derlis González
 Brian Montenegro
 Jorge Rojas
 Tiago Ferreira
 Edgar Ié
 Ricardo
 Tozé
 Paco Alcácer
 Derik
 Sinan Bakış
 Hakan Çalhanoğlu
 Salih Uçan
 Okay Yokuşlu
 Federico Gino
 Felipe Avenatti
 Rubén Bentancourt
 Gonzalo Bueno
 Daniel Cuevas
 Luis Gil
 Shane O'Neill
 Diyorjon Turapov

1 own goal
 Jozo Šimunović (playing against Chile)

Final ranking

Miscellanea

Trophy
The winners were the first team to receive an updated version of the trophy, with Rebecca Cusack and Thomas R. Fattorini of Thomas Fattorini Ltd, Birmingham taking over from Sawaya & Moroni  as suppliers of FIFA competitions.

Vanishing spray
A “vanishing spray” made its FIFA debut (versions were already in use in CONCACAF and CONMEBOL competitions) during this tournament, with referees using it to denote the ten-yard mark for an opposing defence at time of free kicks.

Media coverage

Latin America 

 (All Latin America): ESPN and Fox Sports (broadcast 40 matches live)
 South America and Caribbean: DirecTV Sports
 Mexico and Central America: Sky Sports Latin America
 : Caracol Televisión, RCN Televisión
 : Monte Carlo TV, Teledoce and Tenfield / VTV  (32 matches live on VTV or VTV Plus).
 : SNT, Telefuturo, Tigo Sports (32 matches live on Tigo Sports or Tigo Sports Plus).
 : TV Azteca, Televisa, TDN (32 matches live on TDN or TDN 2).

Asia 
 : antv, tvOne

Europe 
 : ARD, ZDF
 : RTP

References

External links

FIFA U-20 World Cup Turkey 2013 , FIFA.com
RSSSF > FIFA World Youth Championship > 2013
FIFA Technical Report

 
2013
FIFA U-20 World Cup
FIFA U-20 World Cup
2013 FIFA U-20 World Cup
Youth football in Turkey
2013 FIFA U-20 World Cup
2013 FIFA U-20 World Cup
2013 FIFA U-20 World Cup
2013 FIFA U-20 World Cup
2013 FIFA U-20 World Cup
2013 FIFA U-20 World Cup
2013 FIFA U-20 World Cup
2013 FIFA U-20 World Cup

June 2013 sports events in Europe
July 2013 sports events in Europe
2013 in youth association football